Orbiter X: An adventure in the conquest of space is a BBC Radio science fiction programme written by B. D. Chapman. Only a single series was produced which was broadcast on the BBC Light Programme on Monday evenings in late 1959. Presumed to have been wiped and lost, a set of discs of the entire series, recorded for the BBC Transcription Service, was discovered and restored. Since 2016, Orbiter X has occasionally been repeated on the BBC's archive station, BBC Radio 4 Extra.

Plot
The fictional Commomwealth Space Project (CSP), based in Woomera, South Australia, is working to build a space station orbiting a thousand miles above the Earth's surface: Orbiter X. Planned to be a refuelling station for further space exploration, along with laboratories and other services, the CSP has launched the various components for the space station into orbit. But before construction can begin, the first assembly ship, Orbiter 1, is seemingly attacked and loses contact with CSP Control. A second ship, Orbiter 2, piloted by Captain Bob Britton (John Carson), sent to rescue the first crew finds Orbiter 1 deserted and the spacecraft's log missing. Orbiter 2 is also attacked by a UFO and Flight Engineer 'Hicky' (Barrie Gosney) seriously injured. With their spacecraft crippled, the crew have no alternative but to abandon ship and place themselves at the mercy of their attackers. Once aboard the UFO, they meet Commander Gelbin (Arthur Lawrence), the deputy leader of the Unity organisation: a group of technocrats who plan to use Orbiter X themselves and create a New World Order.

Background
Writing in the Radio Times, the programme's creator said:

Production details
The producer of Orbiter X, Charles Maxwell, aimed to make the series authentic as possible. During the studio recordings, the cast wore 'space helmets' to help them to achieve a sense of realism. Harry Morriss and Ian Cook created around 40 different sound effects for the series, with "as many as four or five effects sometimes being blended together to produce one particular sound".

Cast 
The complete cast, as listed in the Radio Times, was:

Episode list

References

External links
 
Tim Worthington's Newsround blog on Orbiter X

BBC Light Programme programmes
BBC Radio dramas
British science fiction radio programmes
Space opera
Works about astronauts
Works set in outer space
1959 radio programme debuts
1959 radio programme endings
1959 radio dramas